The 1997 United Kingdom general election in England was held on 1 May 1997 for 529 English seats to the House of Commons. Under Tony Blair, the Labour Party won a landslide majority of English seats, the first time since 1966 that Labour had won an overall majority of English seats. The England result, together with even larger landslide Labour results in Scotland and Wales, gave Labour the biggest majority for any single party since 1931. Blair subsequently formed the first Labour government since 1979, beginning 13 years of Labour government.

Results table

Regional results

Regional vote shares and changes are sourced from the House of Commons Library.

North East

North West

Merseyside

Yorkshire and the Humber

East Midlands

West Midlands

East of England

London

South East

South West

See also
 1997 United Kingdom general election in Northern Ireland
 1997 United Kingdom general election in Scotland
 1997 United Kingdom general election in Wales

Notes

References

England
1997 in England
General elections in England to the Parliament of the United Kingdom